2010 Southern 100 Races were held between Monday 12 July and Thursday 15 July on the 4.25-mile Billown Circuit near Castletown, Isle of Man.

The main event was won by Ryan Farquhar claiming victory in the 2010 Southern 100 Solo Championship race, held over 2 legs after Michael Dunlop crashed at Iron Gate on lap 5. The 2010 Southern 100 Races consisted of twelve races including four combined races with Ryan Farquhar, Michael Dunlop and William Dunlop taking the most wins with three victories each. The two 400cc races were won by Roy Richardson and Alastair Howarth respectively, with Chris Palmer winning the second of the 125cc combined races.  In the other combined classes, the inaugural 650cc twin-cylinder race was won by Ryan Farquhar and a 600cc class win for Wayne Hamilton in the combined 1000cc/600cc race.  The 600cc support race produced a first time winner for local Isle of Man competitor Paul Smyth and other first time winners included Klaus Klaffenböck/Dan Sayle winning both Sidecar Races and William Cowden in the Senior Support Race.

Results

Race 1; 2010 Senior Race final standings
Tuesday 13 July 2010 5 laps – 21.25 miles Billown Circuit (Reduced Race Distance)

Fastest Lap : Ian Lougher, 2' 30.098 101.933 mph on lap 5

Race 10; 2010 Southern 100 Races Solo Championship final standings
Thursday 15 July 2010 8 laps – 34.00 miles Billown Circuit (Reduced Race Distance held over 2 parts)

Fastest Lap : Ryan Farquhar, 2' 18.112 110.780 mph on lap 2

Sources

External links

Southern 100
2010
South